Killeen or Killean is a small village and townland in the civil parish of Killeavy, County Armagh, Northern Ireland. It lies about four miles (6.5 km) south of Newry, near the border with County Louth in the Republic of Ireland.

In the 2001 Census, it had a population of 75 people. It lies within the Newry, Mourne and Down District Council area. 

McKeever Park lies within Killean on the Bog road. It is home to the Armagh LGFA and was Saint Michael's Killean GFC before Armagh ladies. It is the only ladies' Gaelic football club to have their own home pitch.

History
For more information, see The Troubles in Killeen, which includes a list of incidents in the area during "the Troubles" resulting in two or more fatalities.

Education
The sole school within the village is St Michael's Primary School, 29 Killean School Road.

Places of worship
The primary place of worship in the village is St. Michael's Chapel, a Roman Catholic church.

Natives
Máire Drumm, a vice-president of Sinn Féin from 1972 until her death in 1976, was from the village.

Notes

References

External links
NI Neighbourhood Information System

Villages in County Armagh
Townlands of County Armagh